Zsujta is a village in Borsod-Abaúj-Zemplén county, Hungary. A large Bronze Age hoard of weapons and cart fittings (one in the shape of a duck), was discovered at the village in the late 19th century. The hoard is now in the collections of the British Museum, London.

See also
Forró for another Bronze Age hoard from northern Hungary
Paks-Dunaföldvár gold hoard from the Bronze Age

External links 
 Street map 
  The duck-shaped cart fitting from the hoard on the British Museum's website
 The whole hoard on the British Museum's website

Populated places in Borsod-Abaúj-Zemplén County